The United States contains a number of mountain ranges named Antelope (or 
similar):

Lists of mountains of the United States
Lists of mountain ranges of the United States